Adrian Rusu (born 28 July 1984) is a Romanian footballer who plays as a central defender. He received the "Meritul Sportiv" Medal in 2006 from president Traian Băsescu.

Club career

Rusu began his professional career with FC UTA Arad in 2003. He played his first professional match with Rapid II București in 2005. Rusu played for Pandurii Târgu-Jiu from 2006 to 2010, then joined FC Brașov in 2010, for a one-season loan.

Honours

Club
Pandurii
Liga I (1): runner-up 2013

References

External links

Sportspeople from Arad, Romania
Living people
Romanian footballers
Liga I players
FC UTA Arad players
FC Brașov (1936) players
FC Rapid București players
CS Pandurii Târgu Jiu players
CS Șoimii Pâncota players
1984 births
Association football defenders